The 1988–89 Courage League National Division Two was the second full season of rugby union within the second tier of the English league system, currently known as the RFU Championship. Each team played one match against each of the other teams in the league, playing a total of eleven matches. For the first time matches were played on fixed Saturdays. Joining the ten teams that remained in the division were Coventry and Sale who finished 11th and 12th respectively in last seasons Courage League Division One.

Saracens, the champions, were promoted to the Courage League National Division One for season 1989–90 along with the runners–up Bedford. Bottom team London Welsh and London Scottish who finished 11th were relegated to Courage League National Division Three for season 1989–90. They were replaced by Plymouth Albion and Rugby.

Participating teams

Table

Sponsorship
National Division Two is part of the Courage Clubs Championship and is sponsored by Courage Brewery

See also
 English rugby union system

References

N2
RFU Championship seasons